Luis Collazo (born April 22, 1981) is an American professional boxer who held the WBA welterweight title from 2005 to 2006.

Professional career 
Collazo is of Puerto Rican descent, and grew up in Brooklyn, New York.

Collazo won the WBA Welterweight title on April 2, 2005 with a 12-round split decision victory over defending champion Jose Antonio Rivera. However, the WBA had elevated Cory Spinks to "Undisputed Champion" status before he had lost his titles to Zab Judah, so Collazo was not yet the definitive champion of that organization. On January 7, 2006, Judah lost a 12-round decision to Carlos Baldomir in New York. Baldomir had chosen to pay the sanctioning fee of the WBC only; as a result Judah's WBA undisputed title was vacated. With Judah's loss, Collazo then attained recognition as the WBA's sole welterweight champion. On May 13, 2006, he lost the title to Ricky Hatton in a very tight and controversial affair which went the distance.

On February 10, 2007 he lost a 12-round unanimous decision versus Sugar Shane Mosley in which he injured his hand early in the fight and continued on till the end. After working back from the injury through rehab and aggressive training, by long-time trainer Nirmal Lorick, Luis fought on the Roy Jones Jr. vs. Félix Trinidad card, January 19, 2008 at Madison Square Gardens. He won a one-sided victory against Edvan Dos Santos Barros (9-5-1, 7 KOs), winning 100-90 on 2 judges' scorecards and 99-91 on the other.

On September 28, 2008 on the Mosley vs. Mayorga undercard, Collazo stopped Russell Jordan (now 15-6) in the eighth and final round of their bout.

On January 17, 2009, Collazo fought the undefeated Andre Berto for the WBC Welterweight. Collazo lost a very close fight and a controversial unanimous decision after 12 rounds. Collazo appeared to be ahead most of the fight. The scores were 113-114, 113-114 and the third judge Bill Clancy scored the bout 111-116 which was found by some to be controversial.

On January 30, 2014, Collazo defeated Victor Ortiz in the first match up for Ortiz since his jaw was broken. Collazo landed a right hook to Ortiz in the last second of the second round which ended the match after the 10 count.

Luis Collazo also faced Amir Khan in 2014, Khan dominated all rounds and scored three knockdowns during the fight.

Collazo vs. Vargas 
On March 17, 2019, Collazo, ranked #10 by the WBO at welterweight, fought WBA's #10 Samuel Vargas. After a slow start, Collazo found his rhythm and outboxed Vargas enough to earn a split-decision victory, 98-92, 96-94 and 94-96.

Collazo vs. Abdukakhorov 
In his next fight, Collazo fought Abdukakhorov, who was ranked #1 by the IBF, #5 by the WBC and #11 by the WBO at welterweight. The fight was competitive in the first half, but the younger, fresher Abdukakhorov prevailed in the second part of the fight. At 2:03 in the tenth round, Collazo was cut badly after a clash of heads and was not able to continue the fight. Abdukakhorov was awarded a technical decision victory.

Professional boxing record

See also
List of Puerto Rican boxing world champions

References

External links

Luis Collazo - Profile, News Archive & Current Rankings at Box.Live

1981 births
Boxers from New York City
Living people
Sportspeople from Brooklyn
American sportspeople of Puerto Rican descent
Southpaw boxers
American male boxers
World Boxing Association champions
World welterweight boxing champions